Auguste Serrurier (born 25 March 1857 in Denain, date of death unknown) was a French competitor in the sport of archery.  Serrurier competed in two events, taking second place in both the Sur la Perche à la Herse and the Sur la Perche à la Pyramide competitions. He is now considered by the International Olympic Committee to have won two silver medals.  No scores are known from those competitions, though it is known that Serrurier tied with Emile Druart for second in the à la Herse event, and both are silver medallists.

See also
 Archery at the 1900 Summer Olympics

Notes
  - Prizes at the time were silver medals for first place and bronze medals for second, as well as usually including cash awards.  The current gold, silver, bronze medal system was initiated at the 1904 Summer Olympics.  The International Olympic Committee has retroactively assigned medals in the current system to top three placers at early Olympics.

References

External links

 

1857 births
Year of death missing
Archers at the 1900 Summer Olympics
Olympic archers of France
Olympic silver medalists for France
French male archers
Olympic medalists in archery
Medalists at the 1900 Summer Olympics
People from Denain
Sportspeople from Nord (French department)
Place of death missing